Vela International Marine Limited is a Bahri-owned company. Vela, established in 1984, currently owns 29 oil tankers most of which are very large crude carriers (VLCCs).

Vela International Marine's ship the MV Sirius Star was hijacked by Somali pirates on 15 November 2008 and released 9 January 2009 after a $3 million ransom was paid.

Vela was owned by Saudi Aramco but was sold to Bahri for $1.3 billion 2012.

The Vela Fleet
The current fleet consists of:
Albutain Star -- 
Aldebaran Star --
Almizan Star --
Alnasl Star --
Altair Star --
Alphard Star-- 
Altarf Star -- 
Antares Star --
Aries Star  -- 
Capricorn Star  -- 
Gemini Star-- 
Homan Star-- 
Janah Star --
Leo Star  -- 
Markab Star -- 
Mirfak Star-- 
Perkhad Star --
Phoenix Star--
Pisces Star  -- 
Polaris Star --
Saiph Star --
Serius Star --
Shaula Star-- 
Manifa -- .
Suhail Star-- 
Vega Star --
Virgo Star -- 
Zaurak Star --

Vela International Marine Limited is ranked the sixth largest VLCC owner in the world:
1,100 Employees Worldwide.
1,000 Voyages/Year.
Own & Operate 26 Tankers.
22 VLCC Vessels: 2.1 MM BBL/Voyage.
One Aframax Tanker: 0.6 MM BBL/Voyage.
Four Medium Rang Tankers: 0.3 MM BBL/Voyage.
Vela Transports 3 MM BBL/Day, 83% Internationally, 17% Domestically.

References

Saudi Aramco